The South African cricket team toured England in the 1924 season to play a five-match Test series against England.

England won the series 3-0 with 2 matches drawn.

The South African team
The tourists, with their ages on the first day of the first match of the tour on 3 May, were:
Herbie Taylor (captain, 34)
Mick Commaille (vice-captain, 41)
George Bissett (18)
Jimmy Blanckenberg (31)
Claude Carter (43)
Bob Catterall (23)
Nummy Deane (28)
Cec Dixon (33)
Philip Hands (34)
George Hearne (36)
Doug Meintjes (33)
Dave Nourse (45)
Buster Nupen (22)
Sid Pegler (35)
Fred Susskind (32)
Tommy Ward (36)
George Parker (24) also played three first-class matches (including the first two Tests) and Aubrey Faulkner (42) played one match, the Third Test. The manager was George Allsop.

Test series summary

First Test

Second Test

Third Test

Fourth Test
{{Two-innings cricket match
| date = 26–29 July 1924(3-day match)
| team1 = 
| team2 = 

| score-team1-inns1 = 116/4 (66.5 overs)
| runs-team1-inns1 = TA Ward 50
| wickets-team1-inns1 = MW Tate 3/34 (24 overs)

| score-team2-inns1 = 
| runs-team2-inns1 = 
| wickets-team2-inns1 =

| score-team1-inns2 = 
| runs-team1-inns2 = 
| wickets-team1-inns2 =

| score-team2-inns2 = 
| runs-team2-inns2 = 
| wickets-team2-inns2 =

| result = Match drawn
| report = Scorecard
| venue = Old Trafford, Manchester
| umpires = HR Butt and AE Street
| rain = 27 July was taken as a rest day.There was no play on the second or third days.| toss = South Africa won the toss and elected to bat.
| notes = JCW MacBryan, G Geary and G Duckworth (all ENG) made their Test debuts.
}}

Fifth Test

 References 

Further reading
 Bill Frindall, The Wisden Book of Test Cricket 1877-1978, Wisden, 1979
 Wisden Cricketers' Almanack'' 1925

External links
 South Africa in England, 1924 at Cricinfo
 South Africa in British Isles 1924 at CricketArchive
 South Africa to England 1924 at Test Cricket Tours

1924 in English cricket
1924 in South African cricket
English cricket seasons in the 20th century
International cricket competitions from 1918–19 to 1945
1924